Slimane Chikh was the Algerian minister for culture in the 1995 government of Mokdad Sifi.

References

External links
Slimane Chikh at UN Library Interfaith Dialogue, Feb 5, 2016

Living people
Year of birth missing (living people)
Culture ministers of Algeria
Place of birth missing (living people)
20th-century Algerian politicians